Henry Norbury (died 1415) of Hoddesdon and Little Berkhamsted in Hertfordshire, was an English soldier and nobleman who served as a Member of Parliament for Bedfordshire in 1454 and 1454.

Biography
Henry was eldest son and heir of John Norbury of Hoddesdon and Little Berkhamsted, by his wife Elizabeth Butler, a daughter of Sir Thomas Butler, MP, and widow of Sir William Heron, jure uxoris Baron Saye.

Career
Henry left Portsmouth in Dec 1435 with a force of 1,000 men for France, as part of the relief force that relieved Rouen in 1436. In 1450 he was in command of a detachment at the siege of Valognes, and led a garrison force from Vire, Normandy and was taken prisoner at the Battle of Formigny.

He served as a Member of Parliament for Bedfordshire in 1454 and 1454.

Marriage and issue
He married Anne Croyser, widow of Ingelram Bruyn and daughter and heiress of William Croyser of Stoke d'Abernon in Surrey; By his wife he had issue including:
Sir John Norbury , eldest son and heir, who married Jane/Joanna Gilbert, by whom he had a sole daughter and heiress Anne Norbury, who married Sir Richard Haleighwell of Halwell in Devon. Their daughter and sole heiress Jane Haleighwell married Edmund Braye, 1st Baron Braye.
Ralph Norbury;
Elizabeth Norbury, who married firstly William Sydney and secondly Thomas Uvedale.
Cecily Norbury;
Jane Norbury, who married Thomas Cruse;
Rose Norbury, who married a member of the St John. family;
Anne Norbury, who married Richard Hawkes.

Death and burial
He was buried at the Greyfriars, London.

Citations

References
 
 

Year of birth unknown
Year of death unknown
15th-century English people
English soldiers
15th-century military history of the Kingdom of England
Place of birth missing